Laetesia forsteri is a species of sheet weaver found in New South Wales, Australia. It was described by Wunderlich in 1976.

References

Linyphiidae
Spiders of Australia
Spiders described in 1976